A beach fale is a simple thatched hut in the architecture of Samoa. Beach fales are also common in other parts of Polynesia. They have become popular in tourism as a low budget accommodation situated by the coast, built with a few posts, no walls and a thatched roof with a round or oval shape.

The word  (pronounced fah-leh) is the Samoan word for any type of building. A similar word is used in other Polynesian languages, for example whare in the Māori language.

In the Samoan language, these simple huts are called . They are common in villages where they provide extra storage or space for dragon boats.

Beach fale are usually located around the coast in villages.  In Samoa, renting out a beach fale to visitors is a common means for providing extra income for families.

Gallery

Fale tele

In comparison to beach fale, this is a large traditional Samoan house, fale tele which serves as a meeting house or guest house.

References

External links
 Samoa Tourism Authority

Beach houses
House types
Huts
Pavilions
Thatched buildings
Samoan culture
American Samoan culture
Samoan words and phrases